Marcellin is a given name. Notable people with the name include:

 Marcellin Berthelot (1827–1907), French chemist and politician
 Marcellin Boule (1861–1942), French palaeontologist
 Marcellin Desboutin, French painter, printmaker and writer
 Marcellin Champagnat (1789–1840), founder of the Marist Brothers, a religious congregation of men in the Roman Catholic Church dedicated to education
 Marcellin Gaha Djiadeu (born 1982), professional Cameroonian football player
 Marcellin Mve Ebang (born 1959), Gabonese politician

See also
 Marcellin (disambiguation)

French masculine given names